Ban Ban may refer to:
People
 Betty Lai (born 1953), also known by her stage name Ban Ban

Location
 Ban Ban Springs, Queensland, a locality in the Burnett River region of Queensland, Australia
 Ban Ban, Queensland, a larger locality surrounding Ban Ban Springs in Queensland
 Ban Ban National Park, southeast of the locality by the same name